Liceo Técnico Profesional Alberto Hurtado is a Chilean high school located in Mostazal, Cachapoal Province.

Its principal is Luis Orellana Miquel, and it had 416 students as of 2012.

See also

 Education in Chile

References 

1994 establishments in Chile
Educational institutions established in 1994
Schools in Cachapoal Province
Secondary schools in Chile